Heterogaspis is an extinct genus of placoderm that lived during the Late Devonian period of Spitsbergen, Norway.

References

Placoderms of Europe
Phlyctaeniidae